Le Ponthou is a commune in the Finistère department of Brittany in north-western France. On 1 January 2019, it was merged into the commune Plouigneau.

Population
Inhabitants of Le Ponthou are called in French Ponthousiens.

See also
Communes of the Finistère department

References

Former communes of Finistère